Kogan Page is an independent publishing company founded in 1967 and headquartered in London, with branches in New York and New Delhi. Kogan Page specialises in business books and digital content, with over 1,000 titles published in key subject areas. The company's Managing Director is Helen Kogan and the publishing house is home to a number of authors. In 2007, Kogan Page's founder, Philip Kogan, was recognised with an IPG Lifetime Achievement Award. Kogan died from pneumonia on 24 December 2022, at the age of 92.

Publishing areas and partners 
The company operates internationally and publishes in eight key areas: accounting, finance and banking; business and management; digital and technology; human resources, learning and development; marketing and communications; risk and compliance; skills, careers and employability; logistics, supply chains and operations. Kogan Page's publishing partners include the Chartered Institute of Personnel and Development, the Chartered Institute of Public Relations, the Institute of Practitioners in Advertising, the Chartered Institute of Logistics and Transport, The Daily Telegraph, Accenture and the Trade Union Congress.

List of authors 
Kogan Page has published a number of award-winning books. Published authors include:

 Betty Adamou
 Michael Armstrong
 Colin Barrow
 Sonya Barlow
 Anne Boden
 Marianne Cantwell
 Alan Cutler
 David Conway
 Marion Debruyne
 Erik de Haan
 Charles Elvin
 Mark Gallagher
 Colin Gautrey
 Carlos Gil
 James Goodwin
 Tom Goodwin
 Julia Hobsbawm
 Paul Hopkin
 Jean-Noel Kapferer
 Anthony Kasozi
 Tim Knight
 JP Kuehlwein
 Derek Loudermilk
 Malcolm Morley
 Kevin Murray
 Jo Owen
 Igor Pejic
 Simon Phillips
 Norman Pickavance
 Penny Pullan
 Carl Reader
 Robin Ryde
 Wolfgang Schaefer
 Paul Sloane
 Doug Strycharczyck
 Ralph Cleland Tiffin
 David Tovey
 John Westwood
 Mark Wickersham

References

External links 

Book publishing companies of the United Kingdom
Publishing companies established in 1967
1967 establishments in England